Florence County is the name of two counties in the United States:

Florence County, South Carolina 
Florence County, Wisconsin